Luca Antonino Mezzano (born 1 August 1977) is an Italian football coach and former player who played as a defender. He is youth coach of Torino (responsible for the Esordienti – 13-year-old team).

Club career
Born in Turin, Mezzano started his career at hometown club Torino, and joined Internazionale in 1997. Despite being contracted for four seasons with the Nerazzurri, he only made ten appearances with the club across al competitions and was mostly sent on loan to other teams in Serie A and Serie B. He returned to Torino in 2001, spending four seasons with the club before playing with Bologna, Treviso and Triestina in Serie B. He retired in 2010, aged 33, after a spell at Arezzo in Italy's third division.

He played 71 Serie A games, making his debut against A.S. Roma, on 25 February 1996 and won UEFA Cup in 1997-98 when playing with Inter.

International career
With the Italy youth team, he won the 2000 UEFA European Under-21 Football Championship and was a quarter-finalist at the 2000 Summer Olympics.

External links
 National Teams stats at FIGC
http://www.gazzetta.it/speciali/2008/calcio/Players/player_p5779.shtml

1977 births
Living people
Association football defenders
Italian footballers
Footballers at the 2000 Summer Olympics
Olympic footballers of Italy
Italy under-21 international footballers
Torino F.C. players
Inter Milan players
A.C. Perugia Calcio players
Hellas Verona F.C. players
Brescia Calcio players
A.C. ChievoVerona players
Reggina 1914 players
Bologna F.C. 1909 players
Treviso F.B.C. 1993 players
U.S. Triestina Calcio 1918 players
S.S. Arezzo players
UEFA Cup winning players
Serie A players
Serie B players
Serie C players